Marcello, I'm So Bored is a 1966 short animated film co-directed by John Milius and John Strawbridge. The film was made when Milius was a student at the University of Southern California and was a parody of Italian cinema.

The film was edited by George Lucas.

References

External links

Marcello, I'm So Bored at the British Film Institute

1966 animated films
1966 films
1960s animated short films
American animated short films
Films directed by John Milius
American student films
American parody films
1960s American films